

Events

Pre-1600
 335 – Athanasius is banished to Trier, on the charge that he prevented a grain fleet from sailing to Constantinople.
 680 – The Sixth Ecumenical Council commences in Constantinople.
 921 – Treaty of Bonn: The Frankish kings Charles the Simple and Henry the Fowler sign a peace treaty or 'pact of friendship' to recognize their borders along the Rhine.  
1492 – The Ensisheim meteorite, the oldest meteorite with a known date of impact, strikes the Earth around noon in a wheat field outside the village of Ensisheim, Alsace, France.
1504 – Christopher Columbus returns from his fourth and last voyage.

1601–1900
1619 – Elizabeth Stuart is crowned Queen of Bohemia.
1665 – The London Gazette, the oldest surviving journal, is first published.
1723 – O Ewigkeit, du Donnerwort, BWV 60, a dialogue cantata by Johann Sebastian Bach for Leipzig, was first performed.
1775 – John Murray, the Royal Governor of the Colony of Virginia, starts the first mass emancipation of slaves in North America by issuing Lord Dunmore's Offer of Emancipation, which offers freedom to slaves who abandoned their colonial masters to fight with Murray and the British.
1786 – The oldest musical organization in the United States is founded as the Stoughton Musical Society.
1811 – Tecumseh's War: The Battle of Tippecanoe is fought near present-day Battle Ground, Indiana, United States.
1837 – In Alton, Illinois, abolitionist printer Elijah P. Lovejoy is shot dead by a mob while attempting to protect his printing shop from being destroyed a third time.
1861 – American Civil War: Battle of Belmont: In Belmont, Missouri, Union forces led by General Ulysses S. Grant overrun a Confederate camp but are forced to retreat when Confederate reinforcements arrive.
  1861   – The first Melbourne Cup horse race is held in Melbourne, Australia. 
1874 – A cartoon by Thomas Nast in Harper's Weekly, is considered the first important use of an elephant as a symbol for the United States Republican Party.
1881 – Mapuche uprising of 1881: Mapuche rebels destroy the Chilean settlement of Nueva Imperial after defenders fled to the hills. 
1885 – The completion of Canada's first transcontinental railway is symbolized by the Last Spike ceremony at Craigellachie, British Columbia.
1893 – Women's suffrage: Women in the U.S. state of Colorado are granted the right to vote, the second state to do so.
1900 – Second Boer War: The Battle of  takes place, during which the Royal Canadian Dragoons win three Victoria Crosses.
  1900   – The People's Party is founded in Cuba.

1901–present
1910 – The first air freight shipment (from Dayton, Ohio, to Columbus, Ohio) is undertaken by the Wright brothers and department store owner Max Morehouse.
1912 – The  (now ) opens in the Berlin neighborhood of Charlottenburg, with a production of Beethoven's Fidelio.
1913 – The first day of the Great Lakes Storm of 1913, a massive blizzard that ultimately killed 250 and caused over $5 million (about $118,098,000 in 2013 dollars) damage. Winds reach hurricane force on this date.
  1914   – The German colony of Kiaochow Bay and its centre at Tsingtao are captured by Japanese forces.
1916 – Jeannette Rankin is the first woman elected to the United States Congress.
  1916   – Woodrow Wilson is reelected as President of the United States.
  1916   – Boston Elevated Railway Company's streetcar No. 393 smashes through the warning gates of the open Summer Street drawbridge in Boston, Massachusetts, plunging into the frigid waters of Fort Point Channel, killing 46 people.
1917 – The October Revolution, which gets its name from the Julian calendar date of 25 October, occurs, according to the Gregorian calendar; on this date, the Bolsheviks storm the Winter Palace.
  1917   – World War I: The Third Battle of Gaza ends, with British forces capturing Gaza from the Ottoman Empire.
1918 – The 1918 influenza epidemic spreads to Western Samoa, killing 7,542 (about 20% of the population) by the end of the year.
  1918   – Kurt Eisner overthrows the Wittelsbach dynasty in the Kingdom of Bavaria.
1919 – The first Palmer Raid is conducted on the second anniversary of the Russian Revolution. Over 10,000 suspected communists and anarchists are arrested in 23 U.S. cities.
1920 – Patriarch Tikhon of Moscow issues a decree that leads to the formation of the Russian Orthodox Church Outside Russia.
1929 – In New York City, the Museum of Modern Art opens to the public.
1931 – The Chinese Soviet Republic is proclaimed on the anniversary of the October Revolution.
1933 – Fiorello H. La Guardia is elected the 99th mayor of New York City.
1936 – Spanish Civil War: The Madrid Defense Council is formed to coordinate the Defense of Madrid against nationalist forces.
1940 – In Tacoma, Washington, the original Tacoma Narrows Bridge collapses in a windstorm, a mere four months after the bridge's completion.
1941 – World War II: Soviet hospital ship Armenia is sunk by German planes while evacuating refugees and wounded military and staff of several Crimean hospitals. It is estimated that over 5,000 people died in the sinking.
1944 – Soviet spy Richard Sorge, a half-Russian, half-German World War I veteran, is hanged by his Japanese captors along with 34 of his ring.
  1944   – Franklin D. Roosevelt is elected for a record fourth term as President of the United States.
1949 – The first oil was taken in Oil Rocks (Neft Daşları), the world's oldest offshore oil platform.
1956 – Suez Crisis: The United Nations General Assembly adopts a resolution calling for the United Kingdom, France and Israel to immediately withdraw their troops from Egypt.
  1956   – Hungarian Revolution: János Kádár returns to Budapest in a Soviet armored convoy, officially taking office as the next Hungarian leader. By this point, most armed resistance has been defeated.
1957 – Cold War: The Gaither Report calls for more American missiles and fallout shelters.
1967 – Carl B. Stokes is elected as Mayor of Cleveland, Ohio, becoming the first African American mayor of a major American city.
  1967   – US President Lyndon B. Johnson signs the Public Broadcasting Act of 1967, establishing the Corporation for Public Broadcasting.
1972 – United States presidential election: U.S. President Richard Nixon is re-elected in the largest landslide victory at the time.
1973 – The United States Congress overrides President Richard Nixon's veto of the War Powers Resolution, which limits presidential power to wage war without congressional approval.
1975 – In Bangladesh, a joint force of people and soldiers takes part in an uprising led by Colonel Abu Taher that ousts and kills Brigadier Khaled Mosharraf, freeing the then house-arrested army chief and future president Major General Ziaur Rahman.
1982 – Colonel Saye Zerbo, president of the military government of Upper Volta, is ousted from power in a coup d'état led by Colonel Gabriel Yoryan Somé.
1983 – United States Senate bombing: A bomb explodes inside the United States Capitol. No one is injured, but an estimated $250,000 in damage is caused.
  1983   – Cold War: The command post exercise Able Archer 83 begins, eventually leading to the Soviet Union to place air units in East Germany and Poland on alert, for fear that NATO was preparing for war
1987 – In Tunisia, president Habib Bourguiba is overthrown and replaced by Prime Minister Zine El Abidine Ben Ali.
  1987   – The Mass Rapid Transit (MRT) system in Singapore opens for passenger service. 
1989 – Douglas Wilder wins the governor's seat in Virginia, becoming the first elected African American governor in the United States.
  1989   – David Dinkins becomes the first African American to be elected Mayor of New York City.
  1989   – East German Prime Minister Willi Stoph, along with his entire cabinet, is forced to resign after huge anti-government protests.
1990 – Mary Robinson becomes the first woman to be elected President of the Republic of Ireland.
1991 – Magic Johnson announces that he is HIV-positive and retires from the NBA.
1994 – WXYC, the student radio station of the University of North Carolina at Chapel Hill, launches the world's first internet radio broadcast.
1996 – NASA launches the Mars Global Surveyor.
  1996   – ADC Airlines Flight 086 crashes on approach to Murtala Muhammed International Airport, in Lagos, Nigeria, killing all 144 people on board.
2000 – The controversial US presidential election is later resolved in the Bush v. Gore Supreme Court case, electing George W. Bush as the 43rd President of the United States.
  2000   – The U.S. Drug Enforcement Administration discovers one of the country's largest LSD labs inside a converted military missile silo in Wamego, Kansas.
2004 – Iraq War: The interim government of Iraq calls for a 60-day state of emergency as U.S. forces storm the insurgent stronghold of Fallujah.
2007 – The Jokela school shooting in Jokela, Tuusula, Finland, takes place, resulting in the death of nine people.
2012 – An earthquake off the Pacific coast of Guatemala kills at least 52 people.
2017 – Shamshad TV is attacked by armed gunmen and suicide bombers, with a security guard killed and 20 people wounded; ISIS claims responsibility for the attack.
2020 – Joe Biden is elected the 46th president of the United States.

Births

Pre-1600
 630 – Constans II, Byzantine emperor (d. 668)
 994 – Ibn Hazm, Arabian philosopher and scholar (d. 1069)
1186 – Ögedei Khan, Mongol ruler, 2nd Great Khan of the Mongol Empire (d. 1241)
1316 – Simeon of Russia (d. 1353)
1456 – Margaret of Bavaria, Electress Palatine, Princess of Bavaria-Landshut by birth (d. 1501)
1525 – Georg Cracow, German lawyer and politician (d. 1575)
1598 – Francisco de Zurbarán, Spanish painter (d. 1664)

1601–1900
1619 – Gédéon Tallemant des Réaux, French author and poet (d. 1692)
1650 – John Robinson, English bishop and diplomat (d. 1723)
1683 – Anton thor Helle, German-Estonian clergyman, author, and translator (d. 1748)
1687 – William Stukeley, English archaeologist and physician (d. 1765)
1706 – Carlo Cecere, Italian violinist and composer (d. 1761)
1728 – James Cook, English captain, navigator, and cartographer (d. 1779)
1750 – Friedrich Leopold zu Stolberg-Stolberg, German poet and lawyer (d. 1819)
1787 – Carl Carl, Polish-born actor and theatre director (d. 1854)
1789 – Alfred Kelley, American legislator, canal builder, and railroad magnate (d. 1859)
1800 – Platt Rogers Spencer, American calligrapher and educator (d. 1864)
1805 – Thomas Brassey, English engineer and businessman (d. 1870)
1818 – Emil du Bois-Reymond, German physician and physiologist (d. 1896)
1821 – Andrea Debono, Maltese trader and explorer (d. 1871)
1830 – Emanuele Luigi Galizia, Maltese architect and civil engineer (d. 1907)
1832 – Andrew Dickson White, American historian, academic, and diplomat, co-founded Cornell University (d. 1918)
1838 – Auguste Villiers de l'Isle-Adam, French author and playwright (d. 1889)
1843 – William Plankinton, American businessman, industrialist and banker (d. 1905)
1846 – Ignaz Brüll, Austrian pianist and composer (d. 1907)
1851 – Chris von der Ahe, German-American businessman (d. 1913)
1858 – Bipin Chandra Pal, Indian academic and activist (d. 1932)
1860 – Jean Baptiste Eugène Estienne, French general and engineer (d. 1936)
  1860   – Paul Peel, Canadian painter and academic (d. 1892)
1861 – Jeff Milton, American police officer (d. 1947)
1867 – Marie Curie, Polish chemist and physicist, Nobel Prize laureate (d. 1934)
1872 – Lucille La Verne, American actress (d. 1945)
  1872   – Leonora Speyer, American poet and violinist (d. 1956)
1876 – Charlie Townsend, English cricketer and lawyer (d. 1958)
1878 – Lise Meitner, Austrian-Swedish physicist and academic (d. 1968)
1879 – King Baggot, American actor, director, and screenwriter (d. 1948)
  1879   – Leon Trotsky, Russian theorist and politician, founded the Red Army (d. 1940)
1886 – Aron Nimzowitsch, Russian-Danish chess player and theoretician (d. 1935)
1888 – C. V. Raman, Indian physicist and academic, Nobel Prize laureate (d. 1970)
1890 – Jan Matulka, Czech-American painter and illustrator (d. 1972)
1891 – Genrikh Yagoda, director of the NKVD (d. 1938)
1893 – Leatrice Joy, American actress (d. 1985)
  1893   – Margaret Leech, American historian and author (d. 1974)
1896 – Esdras Minville, Canadian economist and sociologist (d. 1975)
1897 – Herman J. Mankiewicz, American director, producer, and screenwriter (d. 1953)
  1897   – Armstrong Sperry, American author and illustrator (d. 1976)
1898 – Margaret Morris, American actress (d. 1968)
  1898   – Raphaël Salem, Greek-French mathematician and academic (d. 1963)
1899 – Yitzhak Lamdan, Russian-Israeli journalist and poet (d. 1954)
1900 – Nellie Campobello, Mexican writer who chronicled the Mexican Revolution (d. 1986)

1901–present
1901 – Norah McGuinness, Irish painter and illustrator (d. 1980)
1903 – Ary Barroso, Brazilian pianist and composer (d. 1964)
  1903   – Dean Jagger, American actor (d. 1991)
  1903   – Konrad Lorenz, Austrian zoologist, ethologist, and ornithologist, Nobel Prize laureate (d. 1989)
1905 – William Alwyn, English composer, conductor, and educator (d. 1985)
1906 – Eugene Carson Blake, American minister and educator (d. 1985)
1908 – Marijac, French author and illustrator (d. 1994)
1909 – Ruby Hurley, American civil rights activist (d. 1980)
  1909   – Norman Krasna, American director, producer, screenwriter, and playwright (d. 1984)
1912 – Victor Beaumont, German-English actor (d. 1977)
1913 – Albert Camus, French novelist, philosopher, and journalist, Nobel Prize laureate (d. 1960)
  1913   – Alekos Sakellarios, Greek director and screenwriter (d. 1991)
  1913   – Mikhail Solomentsev, Soviet politician, member of the Politburo of the Central Committee of the Communist Party of the Soviet Union (d. 2008)
1914 – Archie Campbell, American actor, singer, and screenwriter (d. 1987)
  1914   – R. A. Lafferty, American author (d. 2002)
1915 – Philip Morrison, American astrophysicist and academic (d. 2005)
  1915   – M. Athalie Range, American activist and politician (d. 2006)
1917 – Titos Vandis, Greek actor (d. 2003)
1918 – Paul Aussaresses, French general (d. 2013)
  1918   – Billy Graham, American minister and author (d. 2018)
  1918   – Maria Teresa de Noronha, Portuguese singer (d. 1993)
1919 – Ellen Stewart, American director and producer (d. 2011)
1920 – Max Kampelman, American lawyer and diplomat (d. 2013)
  1920   – Elaine Morgan, Welsh writer, aquatic ape hypothesis (d. 2013)
1921 – Lisa Ben, American singer-songwriter and journalist (d. 2015)
  1921   – Jack Fleck, American golfer (d. 2014)
  1921   – Susanne Hirzel, member of the White Rose (d. 2012)   
1922 – Ghulam Azam, Bangladeshi politician (d. 2014)
  1922   – Al Hirt, American trumpet player and bandleader (d. 1999)
1923 – Gene Callahan, American art director and production designer (d. 1990)
1926 – Joan Sutherland, Australian soprano (d. 2010)
1927 – Herbert Flam, American tennis player (d. 1980)
1927 – Hiroshi Yamauchi, Japanese businessman (d. 2013)
1928 – Richard G. Scott, American engineer and religious leader (d. 2015)
1929 – Jesús de Polanco, Spanish publisher and businessman (d. 2007)
  1929   – Eric Kandel, Austrian-American neuroscientist and psychiatrist, Nobel Prize laureate
  1929   – Lila Kaye, English actress (d. 2012)
1930 – Rudy Boschwitz, German-American politician
1931 – G. Edward Griffin, American director, producer, and author
1935 – W. S. Rendra, Indonesian poet and playwright (d. 2009)
1936 – Gwyneth Jones, Welsh soprano
  1936   – Al Attles, American basketball player and coach
1937 – Mary Daheim, American journalist and author
1938 – Dee Clark, American singer-songwriter (d. 1990)
  1938   – Jake Gibbs, American baseball player and coach
  1938   – Jim Kaat, American baseball player, coach, and sportscaster
  1938   – Barry Newman, American actor
1939 – Barbara Liskov, American computer scientist and academic
1940 – Dakin Matthews, American actor, director, and playwright
  1940   – Antonio Skármeta, Chilean author and academic
1941 – Madeline Gins, American poet and architect (d. 2014)
  1941   – Angelo Scola, Italian cardinal and philosopher
1942 – Tom Peters, American businessman and author
  1942   – Johnny Rivers, American singer-songwriter, guitarist, and producer
  1942   – Jean Shrimpton, English model and actress
1943 – Silvia Cartwright, New Zealand lawyer, judge, and politician, 18th Governor-General of New Zealand
  1943   – Stephen Greenblatt, American theorist, scholar, and critic
  1943   – Boris Gromov, Russian general and politician, Governor of Moscow Oblast
  1943   – Joni Mitchell, Canadian singer-songwriter and guitarist
  1943   – Michael Spence, American economist and academic, Nobel Prize laureate
1944 – Gigi Riva, Italian footballer and manager
  1944   – Peter Wilby, English journalist
1945 – Joe Niekro, American baseball player (d. 2006)
1946 – Chrystos, American writer and activist
1947 – Bob Anderson, English darts player
  1947   – Rebecca Eaton, American television producer
  1947   – Yutaka Fukumoto, Japanese baseball player and coach
  1947   – Ron Leavitt, American screenwriter and producer (d. 2008)
  1947   – Sondhi Limthongkul, Thai journalist and politician
1948 – Stephen Green, Baron Green of Hurstpierpoint, English businessman and politician
  1948   – Buck Martinez, American baseball player and manager
  1948   – Alex Ribeiro, Brazilian race car driver
1949 – Stephen Bruton, American guitarist, songwriter, and producer (d. 2009)
  1949   – Steven Stucky, American composer and academic (d. 2016)
  1949   – David S. Ware, American saxophonist, composer, and bandleader (d. 2012)
1950 – Lindsay Duncan, Scottish actress
  1950   – John Lang, Australian rugby league player and coach
1951 – Gerard F. Gilmore, New Zealand astronomer and academic
  1951   – Kevin MacMichael, Canadian guitarist, songwriter, and record producer (d. 2002)  
  1951   – Lawrence O'Donnell, American journalist and talk show host
  1951   – John Tamargo, American baseball player and coach
1952 – David Petraeus, American general, Director of the Central Intelligence Agency
  1952   – Modibo Sidibé, Sudanese-Malian police officer and politician, Prime Minister of Mali
  1952   – Valeriy Zuyev, Ukrainian footballer and manager (d. 2016)
1953 – Maire Aunaste, Estonian journalist and author
  1953   – Erik Balke, Norwegian saxophonist and composer
  1953   – Christopher Foster, English bishop
  1953   – Lucinda Green, English equestrian and journalist
1954 – James Gray, Scottish politician
  1954   – Guy Gavriel Kay, Canadian lawyer and author
  1954   – Gil Junger, American director, producer, and screenwriter
  1954   – Kamal Haasan, Tamil actor, director, producer, and screenwriter
1956 – Mikhail Alperin, Ukrainian pianist and composer (d. 2018)
  1956   – Jonathan Palmer, English race car driver and businessman
  1956   – Judy Tenuta, American comedian, actress, and comedy musician (d. 2022)
1957 – John Benitez, American DJ, songwriter, and producer
  1957   – King Kong Bundy, American wrestler (d. 2019)
  1957   – Christopher Knight, American actor
1958 – Dmitry Kozak, Russian politician; Deputy Prime Minister of the Russian Federation
1959 – Billy Gillispie, American basketball player and coach
  1959   – Alexandre Guimarães, Brazilian-Costa Rican footballer and manager
1960 – Tommy Thayer, American guitarist and songwriter 
  1960   – Shyamaprasad, Indian filmmaker
1961 – Orlando Mercado, American baseball player and coach
1962 – Tracie Savage, American actress and journalist
  1962   – Dirk Shafer, American model, actor, and director (d. 2015)
1963 – John Barnes, Jamaican-English footballer and manager
  1963   – Sam Graves, American farmer and politician
1964 – Troy Beyer, American actress, director, and screenwriter
  1964   – Philip Hollobone, English politician
  1964   – Liam Ó Maonlaí, Irish keyboard player and songwriter 
  1964   – Dana Plato, American actress (d. 1999)
  1964   – Bonnie St. John, American skier and scholar
1965 – Steve Parkin, English footballer and manager
  1965   – Sigrun Wodars, German runner and physiotherapist
1966 – Calvin Borel, American jockey
1967 – Steve Di Giorgio, American bass player 
  1967   – David Guetta, French DJ, record producer, remixer, and songwriter
  1967   – Hikaru Ijūin, Japanese radio host
  1967   – Rafael Herbert Reyes, Dominican wrestler
  1967   – Sharleen Spiteri, Scottish singer-songwriter and actress 
1968 – Russ Springer, American baseball player
1969 – Michelle Clunie, American actress
  1969   – Hélène Grimaud, French pianist
  1969   – Michel Picard, Canadian ice hockey player and scout
1970 – Andy Houston, American race car driver
  1970   – Marc Rosset, Swiss-Monacan tennis player
  1970   – Morgan Spurlock, American director, producer, and screenwriter
  1970   – Paul Ware, English footballer (d. 2013)
1971 – Jamie Drummond, Scottish-Canadian journalist and critic
  1971   – Robin Finck, American guitarist and songwriter 
  1971   – Matthew Ryan, American singer-songwriter and guitarist 
  1971   – Trivikram Srinivas, Indian director and screenwriter
1972 – Danny Grewcock, English rugby player
  1972   – Jason London, American actor and producer
  1972   – Jeremy London, American actor and producer
  1972   – Hasim Rahman, American boxer
  1972   – Marcus Stewart, English footballer and coach
1973 – Catê, Brazilian footballer and manager (d. 2011)
  1973   – Yunjin Kim, South Korean-American actress
  1973   – Martín Palermo, Argentinian footballer and manager
1974 – Kris Benson, American baseball player
  1974   – Brigitte Foster-Hylton, Jamaican hurdler
  1974   – Christian Gómez, Argentinian footballer
  1974   – Chris Summers, Norwegian drummer 
1975 – Venkat Prabhu, Indian actor, director, and screenwriter
1976 – Rob Caggiano, American guitarist and producer 
  1976   – Mark Philippoussis, Australian tennis player and model
1977 – Lindsay Czarniak, American journalist and sportscaster
  1977   – Andres Oper, Estonian footballer
  1977   – María Sánchez Lorenzo, Spanish tennis player
  1977   – Anthony Thomas, American football player and coach
1978 – Mohamed Aboutrika, Egyptian footballer
  1978   – Elisabeth Bachman, American volleyball player and coach
  1978   – Rio Ferdinand, English footballer
  1978   – Tomoya Nagase, Japanese singer-songwriter 
  1978   – Barry Robson, Scottish footballer
  1978   – Jan Vennegoor of Hesselink, Dutch footballer
1979 – Mike Commodore, Canadian ice hockey player
  1979   – Will Demps, American football player
  1979   – Danny Fonseca, Costa Rican footballer
  1979   – Barney Harwood, English television host and actor
  1979   – Jon Peter Lewis, American singer-songwriter and actor
  1979   – Amy Purdy, American actress, model and snowboarder
  1979   – Joey Ryan, American wrestler
  1979   – Otep Shamaya, American singer-songwriter and actress 
1980 – Karthik, Indian singer-songwriter
  1980   – Sergio Bernardo Almirón, Argentinian footballer
  1980   – Gervasio Deferr, Spanish gymnast
  1980   – James Franklin, New Zealand cricketer
  1980   – Luciana Salazar, Argentinian model, actress, and singer
1981 – Muhammad Hassan, American wrestler and educator
  1981   – Nana Katase, Japanese model, actress, and singer
  1981   – Anushka Shetty, Indian actress
  1981   – Rina Uchiyama, Japanese actress and model
1982 – Pascal Leclaire, Canadian ice hockey player
1983 – Adam DeVine, American actor, comedian, screenwriter, producer, and singer
  1983   – Forrest Kline, American singer-songwriter and guitarist 
  1983   – Esmerling Vásquez, Dominican baseball player
1984 – Mihkel Aksalu, Estonian footballer
  1984   – Jonathan Bornstein, American-Israeli soccer player
  1984   – Gervais Randrianarisoa, Malagasy footballer
  1984   – Amelia Vega, Dominican actress and singer, Miss Universe 2003
1985 – Sebastian Aldén, Swedish motorcycle racer
  1985   – Lucas Neff, American actor 
1986 – Andy Hull, American singer-songwriter and guitarist
  1986   – David Nelson, American football player
  1986   – Doukissa Nomikou, Greek model and television host
1987 – Mitch Brown, Australian rugby league player
  1987   – Marek Semjan, Slovak tennis player
1988 – Alexandr Dolgopolov, Ukrainian tennis player
  1988   – Simone Favaro, Italian rugby player
  1988   – Thomas Schneider, German sprinter
  1988   – Tinie Tempah, English rapper and producer
1989 – Nadezhda Tolokonnikova, Russian singer and political activist 
1990 – Daniel Ayala, Spanish footballer
  1990   – Matt Corby, Australian singer-songwriter and guitarist
  1990   – David de Gea, Spanish footballer
  1990   – Joelle Hadjia, Australian singer-songwriter
1991 – Felix Rosenqvist, Swedish race car driver
1992 – Apisai Koroisau, Australian-Fijian rugby league player
1994 – Haruna Iikubo, Japanese singer and actress 
1996 – Lorde, New Zealand singer-songwriter
1997 – Erika Hendsel, Estonian tennis player
  1997   – Nana Okada, Japanese singer

Deaths

Pre-1600
 691 – Cen Changqian, official of the Tang Dynasty
   691   – Ge Fuyuan, official of the Tang Dynasty
 927 – Zhu Shouyin, general of Later Tang
1173 – Uijong of Goryeo, Korean monarch of the Goryeo dynasty (b. 1127)
1225 – Engelbert II of Berg, German archbishop and saint (b. 1186)
1497 – Philip II, Duke of Savoy (b. 1443)
1550 – Jón Arason, Icelandic bishop and poet (b. 1484)
1561 – Jeanne de Jussie, Swiss nun and writer  (b. 1503)
1562 – Maldeo Rathore, Rao of Marwar (b. 1511)
1574 – Solomon Luria, Polish rabbi and educator (b. 1510)
1581 – Richard Davies, Welsh bishop and scholar (b. 1505)
1599 – Gasparo Tagliacozzi, Italian surgeon and educator (b. 1546)

1601–1900
1627 – Jahangir, Mughal emperor (b. 1569)
1633 – Cornelis Drebbel, Dutch inventor (b. 1572)
1639 – Thomas Arundell, 1st Baron Arundell of Wardour, English politician (b. 1560)
1642 – Henry Montagu, 1st Earl of Manchester, English judge and politician, Lord High Treasurer of The United Kingdom (b. 1563)
1652 – Henry of Nassau-Siegen, German count, officer in the Dutch Army, diplomat for the Dutch Republic (b. 1611)
1713 – Elizabeth Barry, English actress (b. 1658)
1809 – Paul Sandby, English painter and cartographer (b. 1725)
1837 – Elijah Parish Lovejoy, American minister and journalist (b. 1809)
1862 – Bahadur Shah II, Mughal emperor (b. 1775)
1872 – Alfred Clebsch, German mathematician and academic (b. 1833)
1881 – John MacHale, Irish archbishop (b. 1791)

1901–present
1906 – Heinrich Seidel, German engineer and poet (b. 1842)
1907 – Jesús García, Mexican railroad brakeman (b. 1881)
1913 – Alfred Russel Wallace, Welsh-English biologist and geographer (b. 1823)
1916 – Henry Ward Ranger, American painter and academic (b. 1858)
1919 – Hugo Haase, German lawyer, jurist, and politician (b. 1863)
1922 – Sam Thompson, American baseball player (b. 1860)
1923 – Ashwini Kumar Dutta, Indian educator and philanthropist (b. 1856)
1930 – Ōkido Moriemon, Japanese sumo wrestler, the 23rd Yokozuna (b. 1878)
1933 – Harold Weber, American golfer and architect (b. 1882)
1941 – Frank Pick, English lawyer and businessman (b. 1878)
1944 – Richard Sorge, Azerbaijani-German journalist and spy (b. 1895)
  1944   – Hannah Szenes, Hungarian-Israeli soldier and poet (b. 1921)
1947 – K. Natesa Iyer, Indian-Sri Lankan journalist and politician (b. 1887)
1959 – Victor McLaglen, English-American boxer and actor (b. 1883)
1962 – Eleanor Roosevelt, American humanitarian and politician, 39th First Lady of the United States (b. 1884)
1964 – Hans von Euler-Chelpin, German-Swedish biochemist and academic, Nobel Prize laureate (b. 1863)
1966 – Rube Bressler, American baseball player (b. 1894)
1967 – John Nance Garner, American lawyer and politician, 32nd Vice President of the United States (b. 1868)
1968 – Gordon Coventry, Australian footballer and coach (b. 1901)
  1968   – Alexander Gelfond, Russian mathematician, cryptographer, and academic (b. 1906)
1974 – Eric Linklater, Welsh-Scottish author and academic (b. 1899)
1975 – Piero Dusio, Italian footballer, businessman and race car driver (b. 1899)
1978 – Jivraj Narayan Mehta, Indian surgeon and politician, 6th Chief Minister of Gujarat (b. 1887)
  1978   – Gene Tunney, American boxer and actor (b. 1897)
1980 – İlhan Erdost, Turkish publisher (b. 1944)
  1980   – Steve McQueen, American actor and producer (b. 1930)
1981 – Will Durant, American historian and philosopher (b. 1885)
1983 – Germaine Tailleferre, French pianist and composer (b. 1892)
1986 – Tracy Pew, Australian bass player (b. 1957)
1988 – Bill Hoest, American cartoonist (b. 1926)
1990 – Lawrence Durrell, British novelist, poet, dramatist, (b. 1912)
  1990   – Tom Clancy, Irish singer and actor, (b. 1924)
1991 – Tom of Finland, Finnish illustrator (b. 1920)
  1991   – Nuri Ja'far, Iraqi psychologist and philosopher of education, (b. 1914) 
1992 – Alexander Dubček, Slovak soldier and politician (b. 1921)
  1992   – Jack Kelly, American actor and politician (b. 1927)
1993 – Adelaide Hall, American-English singer, actress, and dancer (b. 1901)
  1993   – Charles Aidman, American stage, film, and television actor (b. 1925)
1994 – Shorty Rogers, American trumpet player and composer (b. 1924)
1995 – Ann Dunham, American anthropologist and academic (b. 1942)
1996 – Claude Ake, Nigerian political scientist and academic (b. 1939)
  1996   – Jaja Wachuku, Nigerian lawyer and politician, Nigerian Minister of Foreign Affairs (b. 1918)
2000 – Ingrid of Sweden (b. 1910)
  2000   – Nimalan Soundaranayagam, Sri Lankan educator and politician (b. 1950)
  2000   – Chidambaram Subramaniam, Indian publisher and politician, Indian Minister of Defence (b. 1910)
2001 – Nida Blanca, Filipino actress (b. 1936)
  2001   – Anthony Shaffer, English author and playwright (b. 1926)
2002 – Rudolf Augstein, German journalist, co-founded Der Spiegel (b. 1923)
2003 – Foo Foo Lammar, British drag queen and nightclub owner (b. 1937)
2004 – Howard Keel, American actor and singer (b. 1919)
2005 – Harry Thompson, English author, screenwriter, and producer (b. 1960)
2006 – Aino Kukk, Estonian chess player and engineer (b. 1930)
  2006   – Bryan Pata, American football player (b. 1984)
  2006   – Johnny Sain, American baseball player and coach (b. 1917)
  2006   – Jean-Jacques Servan-Schreiber, French journalist and politician, co-founded L'Express (b. 1924)
  2006   – Polly Umrigar, Indian cricketer and manager (b. 1926)
2007 – Earl Dodge, American activist and politician (b. 1932)
  2007   – George W. George, American screenwriter and producer (b. 1920)
2011 – Joe Frazier, American boxer (b. 1944)
  2011   – Takanosato Toshihide, Japanese sumo wrestler (b. 1952)
2012 – Carmen Basilio, American boxer (b. 1927)
  2012   – Kevin O'Donnell, Jr., American author (b. 1950)
  2012   – Glenys Page, New Zealand cricketer (b. 1940)
  2012   – Sandy Pearson, Australian general (b. 1918)
  2012   – Darrell Royal, American football player and coach (b. 1924)
  2012   – Arthur K. Snyder, American lawyer and politician (b. 1932)
2013 – John Cole, Irish-English journalist and author (b. 1927)
  2013   – Ian Davies, Australian basketball player and coach (b. 1956)
  2013   – Ron Dellow, English footballer and manager (b. 1914)
  2013   – Joey Manley, American publisher, founded Modern Tales (b. 1965)
  2013   – Jack Mitchell, American photographer and author (b. 1925)
  2013   – Manfred Rommel, German lawyer and politician (b. 1928)
2014 – Lincoln D. Faurer, American general (b. 1928)
  2014   – Kajetan Kovič, Slovenian journalist and poet (b. 1931)
  2014   – Allen Ripley, American baseball player (b. 1952)
2015 – Bappaditya Bandopadhyay, Indian director and poet (b. 1970)
  2015   – Ri Ul-sol, North Korean marshal and politician (b. 1921)
2016 – Leonard Cohen, Canadian singer-songwriter and poet (b. 1934)
  2016   – Janet Reno, American lawyer and government official; Attorney General of the United States (1993–2001) (b. 1938)
  2016   – Jimmy Young, British singer and radio personality (b. 1921)
2017 – Roy Halladay, American baseball player (b. 1977)
  2017   – Carl Sargeant, Welsh Assembly minister (b. 1968)
  2017   – James R. Thompson Jr., American naval officer and engineer, 5th Director of NASA Marshall Space Flight Center (b. 1936)
2019 – Janette Sherman, American physician, author, and pioneer in occupational and environmental health (b. 1930)
2020 – Jonathan Sacks, former Chief Rabbi of the Commonwealth and member of the House of Lords (b. 1948)
2021 – Dean Stockwell, American actor (b. 1936)

Holidays and observances
 Christian feast day:
All Dominican Saints and Blesseds
 Bartholomäus Ziegenbalg (Lutheran)
 Engelbert II of Berg
 Herculanus of Perugia
 John Christian Frederick Heyer (Lutheran)
 Ludwig Ingwer Nommensen (Lutheran)
 Prosdocimus
 Vicente Liem de la Paz (one of Vietnamese Martyrs)
 Willibrord
 November 7 (Eastern Orthodox liturgics)
 Students' Day, the anniversary of B. R. Ambedkar's school entry day. (Maharashtra, India)
 Commemoration Day, the anniversary of Ben Ali's succession. (Tunisia)
 Hungarian Opera Day (Hungary)
 International Inuit Day
 National Day, after Treaty of the Pyrenees. (Northern Catalonia, France)
 National Revolution and Solidarity Day (Bangladesh) 
 October Revolution Day (the Soviet Union (former, official), modern Belarus, Kyrgyzstan)
 Tokhu Emong (Lotha Naga people of India)

References

External links

 
 
 

Days of the year
November